The Mayo Building at the northwest corner of West Fifth Street and  South Main St. in Tulsa, Oklahoma was built in 1910. It had five stories. It was expanded by a duplicate building to the north in 1914, and further expanded by addition of 5 more stories in 1917.
It was listed on the National Register of Historic Places (NRHP) in 2008.

According to its NRHP nomination, the building "is one of Tulsa's earliest business/office buildings". The Tulsa Preservation Commission has stated that it is "...the oldest of Tulsa’s existing oil business buildings."

History
The Mayo Brothers, who had established a thriving furniture business in 1904, had already moved to a larger rented building on Main Street in 1906, then decided they needed still more space, which they began constructing at 420 South Main in 1909. They used half the space for their own business and rented the rest of the building as offices for oil companies. As the demand for office space increased, the Mayos built an identical five story building at 418 South Main in 1914. In 1917, they added five more stories to each structure, and operated them as one building. Profits from the Mayo Building financed later additions to the Mayo real estate empire: the Petroleum Building in 1921, the Mayo Hotel in 1925 and the Mayo Motor Inn in 1950.

On October 24, 1917, a fire at the building claimed the lives of two firefighters from the Tulsa Fire Department. Ross Shepard, 29 years old and Ben Hanes, 27 years old, were taken to their death when a stairway they were fighting fire from collapsed. They were the first two deaths in the line of duty from the department and remain, to this day, the only two to have been killed in a structure fire since the department was founded in 1905.

The building has now been converted to loft apartment use. It was identified as one of the supporting structures during the creation of the Oil Capital Historic District.

References

Commercial buildings on the National Register of Historic Places in Oklahoma
Neoclassical architecture in Oklahoma
Commercial buildings completed in 1910
Buildings and structures in Tulsa, Oklahoma
National Register of Historic Places in Tulsa, Oklahoma